The statutory boards of the Barbados Government are organisations that have been given authority to perform certain functions in society.  They usually report to one specific ministry.

Accreditation Council, The
Archives Advisory Committee, The
Barbados Agricultural Development and Marketing Corporation (BADMC)
Barbados Bar Association
Barbados Museum & Historical Society (BMHS) Council
Barbados Port Incorporated (BPI)
Barbados Water Authority (BWA)
Caribbean Broadcasting Corporation (CBC)
Commission for Pan-African Affairs, The (CPAA) – Established 28 November 1998
Film Censorship Board, The
National Advisory Commission on Education, The
National Assistance Board, The
National Cultural Foundation (NCF), The
Queen Elizabeth Hospital (QEH), The
Rural Development Commission (RDC)
Securities Commission, The
Town and Country Planning
Urban Development Commission (UDC)

Government of Barbados